Ubiquity is a synonym for omnipresence, the property of being present everywhere. 

Ubiquity may also refer to:

 Ubiquity (software), a simple graphical installer made for the Ubuntu operating system
 Ubiquity (Firefox), an experimental extension for the Firefox browser
 Ubiquity (role-playing game system), a table-top RPG system
 Ubiquiti, an American wireless data communication company
 Ubiquity Records, an American music label
 Ubiquity, a publication by the Association for Computing Machinery